Hellinsia basalis is a moth of the family Pterophoridae. It is found in Puerto Rico.

The forewings are pale ochreous and the markings are dark brown. The hindwings are pale brown‑ochreous and the fringes pale grey‑brown. Adults are on wing in April and May.

References

Moths described in 1890
basalis
Insects of Puerto Rico
Moths of the Caribbean